Death of a Friend is a 1959 Italian film directed by Franco Rossi, starring Spyros Focas, Gianni Garko, Angela Luce, Anna Mzzuchelli and Didi Perego.

Cast
 Gianni Garko  as  Aldo
 Spiros Focas as Bruno
 Didi Perego as  Lea
 Angela Luce as  Franca
 Anna Mazzuchelli as  Adriana
Fanfulla as  De Amicis
Olimpia Cavalli as Wanda
 Andrea Scotti as The Frenchman

Censorship
When Morte di Un Amico  was first released in Italy in 1959, the Italian Committee for the Theatrical Review of the Italian Ministry of Cultural Heritage and Activities rated the film not suitable for viewing because it included several immoral scenes which the committee considered to be offensive to public decency. On a second review by the committee, the film was rated not suitable for children under 16 on the proviso that the scene in which Alde and Lea hug each other in bed is removed. The official document number is: 30584. It was signed on 30 November 1959 by Minister Domenico Magrì.

References

Database of the documents produced by the Committee for the Theatrical Review of The Italian Ministry of Cultural Heritage and Activities, from 1944 to 2000.

External links
 

1959 films
Italian drama films
Films directed by Franco Rossi
1950s Italian films